Morton–Myer House is a historic home located at Boonville, Cooper County, Missouri. It was built about 1859 and enlarged about 1870, and is a -story, vernacular brick dwelling with a central hall plan. It has a rear ell and rear shed additions and partial basement. Also on the property are the contributing brick smokehouse and stone cellar.

It was listed on the National Register of Historic Places in 1990.

References

Houses on the National Register of Historic Places in Missouri
Houses completed in 1859
Houses in Cooper County, Missouri
National Register of Historic Places in Cooper County, Missouri
1859 establishments in Missouri
Boonville, Missouri
Central-passage houses